Laura Turpijn (Nijmegen, December 26, 1978 ) is a Dutch mountain biker. She is a multiple Dutch champion in this discipline and has represented the Netherlands several times in the European and World championships.

Cycling career

Turpijn made her breakthrough in 2007 by becoming the Dutch MTB National Champion in both Marathon and Cross Country (XC). She started that year at the European Cross Country championship in Fort William, Scotland, but didn't achieve a significant result due to equipment failure.

In 2010 she came 11th at the European Cross Country Championship in Haifa and had to settle for 33rd place at the Cross Country World Championship in Mont-Sainte-Anne, Canada. In 2011 she came 6th in the European Marathon championship in Kleinzell, Austria, over 21 minutes behind to winner Pia Sundstedt from Finland. She was the Dutch MTB Champion in Marathon in 2008 and 2010, and Champion in XC 2009 and 2012, the last year she competed professionally.

In 2011 and 2013, Turpijn was named Dutch Female MTB rider of the year in an award presented by Club van 5.

International championships
 2007: 34rd World Championships XC in Fort William 
 2010: 11th European Championships XC in Haifa 
 2010: 33rd World Championships XC in Mont-Sainte-Anne
 2011: 6th European Championships marathon in Kleinzell

Key victories
 Dutch MTB Championships (XC): 2007, 2009, 2012
 Dutch MTCH Championships (marathon): 2007, 2008, 2010
 Beach Challenge: 2007
 BeNeLux MTB championship: 2006
 Rabobank MTB Trophy Steps Belt : 2010, 2011
 Antwerp Cup: 2011
 Oldenzaal MTB: 2006
 Berlicum: 2006

References

Dutch mountain bikers
1978 births
Living people